Live Oak Cemetery is an historic cemetery in Selma, Alabama that was founded in 1829.

Live Oak Cemetery may also refer to:
Live Oak Cemetery, in Dublin, Texas
Live Oak Cemetery (Walterboro, South Carolina), in Walterboro, South Carolina where several politicians are buried
Live Oak Cemetery, in Pass Christian, Mississippi where John Henderson and Doyle Overton Hickey are buried
Live Oak Cemetery, in Sandusky, Ohio where Joseph Cable is buried
Live Oak Cemetery, in Concord, California where the founders of Clayton, California are buried
Live Oak Cemetery, in Paulding, Ohio where Francis B. De Witt and John S. Snook are buried
Live Oak Memorial Park, in Monrovia, California where William Norton Monroe is buried
Naval Live Oaks Cemetery, a prehistoric cemetery in Gulf Breeze, Florida